IDS Tirana is a football club based in Tirana, Albania. They recently competed in the Albanian Third Division. Their home ground is the Kamza Sports Complex.

References 

IDS Tirana
IDS Tirana